TOPP or topp may refer to:

 Topp (surname)
 Tagging of Pacific Predators, a project by Census of Marine Life
 The OpenMS Proteomics Pipeline, a set of computational tools  to solve HPLC-MS data pipeline analysis problem
 ToppGirl, a Norwegian magazine formerly known as Topp

See also
 TOP (disambiguation)
 Topps